This is a recap of the 1964 season for the Professional Bowlers Association (PBA) Tour.  It was the tour's sixth season, and consisted of 31 events. Bob Strampe's lone victory on the year was at the fifth PBA National Championship, but he also led the Tour in earnings to win the Sporting News PBA Player of the Year award.

Tournament schedule

External links
1964 Season Schedule

Professional Bowlers Association seasons
1964 in bowling